Carlos Federico Castilla Miguel (born December 26, 1979 in General San Martín, Salta Province) is an Argentine football striker currently playing for Camioneros Argentinos.

Club career
Castilla has an extensive career in football. He began professionally at Gimnasia y Tiro de Salta. Later, he played for important clubs such as Club Atlético Independiente and San Lorenzo de Almagro in Argentina. Castilla also spent some years playing in the Chilean first division for Deportes Concepción and Huachipato. In 2008 and after some years playing in the Argentine second division, he signed with Bolivian side Universitario de Sucre. That same year the team won the Apertura and Castilla was a great contributor in achieving that. His good form rewarded him with a transfer to Blooming in early 2009, but he did not live up to the expectations and was released during the winter break. In July 2009, he relocated to Ecuador and joined Manta Fútbol Club. The following year Castilla returned to Chile and signed for second division side Deportes Antofagasta. In 2011 Castilla joined Universitario for his second stint, but left the club in February 2012.  Textil Mandiyú became his next club not long after.

Club titles

Notes

References

External links
 Argentine Primera statistics 
 
 

1979 births
Living people
Sportspeople from Salta Province
Association football forwards
Argentine footballers
Argentine expatriate footballers
Club Atlético Independiente footballers
San Lorenzo de Almagro footballers
Ferro Carril Oeste footballers
Gimnasia y Esgrima de Jujuy footballers
San Martín de San Juan footballers
San Martín de Tucumán footballers
Instituto footballers
C.D. Huachipato footballers
Club Blooming players
Universitario de Sucre footballers
Deportes Concepción (Chile) footballers
Chilean Primera División players
Argentine Primera División players
Expatriate footballers in Chile
Expatriate footballers in Bolivia
Expatriate footballers in Ecuador
Argentine expatriate sportspeople in Chile
Argentine expatriate sportspeople in Bolivia
Argentine expatriate sportspeople in Ecuador